César Cedeño Encarnación (born February 25, 1951) is a Dominican former professional baseball player and coach.

The four-time All-Star player combined speed and power to become one of the best all around players of his era. Cedeño set the standards for major league outfielders in the early 1970s by winning five consecutive Gold Glove Awards between 1972 and 1976, and he became only the second player in Major League Baseball history to hit 20 home runs and steal 50 bases in one season. He also played for the Cincinnati Reds, St. Louis Cardinals and the Los Angeles Dodgers. 

After his playing career, Cedeño spent several years as a minor league hitting coach for the Astros and Nationals organizations. In 2020, Cedeño was inducted into the Houston Astros Hall of Fame. Cedeño still holds the Astros team record for career stolen bases more than 40 years after last playing for the team.

Baseball career

Houston Astros

Signed by Houston as an amateur free agent in 1967, Cedeño debuted on June 20, 1970, at 19 years of age. The next season, he led the major leagues in doubles. On September 2 of that year, he hit an unusual home run: against the Los Angeles Dodgers in the Astrodome, with the bases loaded, he hit a blooper that dropped between the right fielder and second baseman, who collided with one another as the ball rolled away; Cedeno and the rest of his teammates scurried quickly to reach home plate for an inside-the-park grand slam. The following season, his third, he again led in doubles, not just his league, but in the majors. He batted .320 in both 1972 and 1973. In 1972, Cedeño hit 22 home runs, had 55 stolen bases, and again led the league in doubles. He won a Gold Glove Award that season as well. Houston manager Leo Durocher once compared Cedeño to Willie Mays, saying "At 22 Cedeño is as good or better than Willie was at the same age".

Possessing a rare combination of power, blazing speed, and good defense, he became the second man in Major League history (after Lou Brock in 1967) to hit 20 home runs and steal 50 bases in one season, which he accomplished three years in a row (1972–1974). He also stole 50-plus bases the next three years (1975–1977), twice led the league in doubles (1971–1972) and collected 102 RBI in the 1974 season. He would finish in the top ten of stolen base leaders from 1971–1978 and again in 1980. His 550 stolen bases rank 27th all time as of January 2018. A winner of five consecutive Gold Glove Awards (1972–1976), Cedeño appeared in four All-Star Games (1972–1974; 1976), and was a contender for the National League MVP in 1972. In the All-Star Game of that year, Cedeño beat out Roberto Clemente for the starting National League position. Cedeño also hit for the cycle in both 1972 and 1976.

Cedeno recorded his 1,000th career hit on July 2, 1976, against the Cincinnati Reds, doing so on a single against Pat Zachry, which was the second of four hits he would record in the game (including a 14th inning home run to help boost the Astros to a 10-7 win).

On September 9, 1981, while playing at Atlanta Stadium, Cedeño entered the stands to confront a heckler. No punches were thrown and no charges were filed, but Cedeño was ejected from the game and immediately suspended as a result. On September 11, Cedeño was fined $5,000 by National League President Chub Feeney but received no further suspension, as Cedeño apologized to the fan on the phone and in writing which Feeney cited as "mitigating circumstances".

On December 18, 1981, Cedeño was traded to the Cincinnati Reds for Ray Knight. At the time of his departure from the Astros, he was the team's all-time leader in games played, runs, hits, doubles and stolen bases.

Cincinnati Reds

Cedeño played in 138 games to begin his Reds career, batting .289 with 142 hits with 16 stolen bases while walking/striking out 41 times each. His next few years would be shaky with the Reds, as he played a combined 291 games over the next three seasons, which had peaks of a .291 batting average in 1985 and lows of .232 in 1983, and he would have more strikeouts than walks in each season as well (after doing so nine times in his 12-year career with Houston). Cedeno collected his 2,000th career hit on April 28, 1985, doing so in the fifth inning against Mike Krukow of the San Francisco Giants. This made him the fifth member of the Reds on the roster to be part of the 2,000-hit club, which included Pete Rose, Tony Pérez, Dave Concepción and Buddy Bell.

On August 29 of that year, he was traded to the St. Louis Cardinals for Mark Jackson. He finished his combined 1985 season by playing in 111 games while batting .291 with 14 stolen bases.

St. Louis Cardinals

On August 29, 1985, he was traded for an outfielder named Mark Jackson to the St. Louis Cardinals, where he hit .434 with six home runs in 28 games, and arguably provided the necessary power for his new team to outpace the New York Mets to reach the playoffs.  With only one month left in the season, Cedeño had the Cardinals' longest hitting streak during their 1985 season.  He then played at first base to replace the injured Jack Clark in the final regular season games, and played in the outfield in the playoffs to help replace the injured Vince Coleman. Cedeno was granted free agency on November 12, 1985.

Los Angeles Dodgers

Cedeño finished his career with the Dodgers and played his final game on June 2, 1986.

Estrellas Orientales

In between, Cedeño played six seasons for the Estrellas Orientales club of the Dominican Winter League, and reinforced the Tigres del Licey in the 1972 Caribbean Series. He later played with the Gold Coast Suns of the Senior Professional Baseball Association in its 1989 inaugural season.

Career statistics

In 17 seasons, Cedeño was in 2006 games played, compiling a .285 batting average (2087-7310), with 436 doubles, 60 triples, 199 home runs, 976 RBI, 550 stolen bases, 664 walks, a .347 on-base percentage and .443 slugging percentage. In 17 post-season games, he hit only .173 (9-52). He played first base and all three outfield positions and recorded a .985 fielding percentage.

Coaching career

After retiring, Cedeño has been both a fielding and hitting coach in the Dominican and Venezuelan winter leagues. He also served as a coach for the rookie-level Gulf Coast League farm team of the Washington Nationals before being let go in 2009. After that, he served as a hitting coach for the Greeneville Astros of the Appalachian League.

Personal life
On December 11, 1973, when he was 22 years old, Cedeño was involved in an incident in his native Dominican Republic in which a gun discharged in a motel room, killing a 19-year-old woman who was in the room with him. Authorities said Cedeño and the woman were drinking and playing with a gun when the gun fired, killing the 19-year-old. He was initially charged with voluntary manslaughter and held in prison without bail, while his lawyers negotiated for a reduction of the charge to involuntary manslaughter. He was held for 20 days before he was released on bail. He was found guilty of involuntary manslaughter and fined $100. Cedeño's reputation with fans suffered greatly for the remainder of his career, and Cedeño thereafter never achieved a popularity with fans commensurate with his formidable on-field productivity. In 1992, Cedeño was charged with battery in Orlando, Florida, in an incident involving his then-pregnant girlfriend, Pamela Lamon. This followed a 1988 incident involving Lamon in which Cedeño was charged with assault, causing bodily injury, and resisting arrest.

See also

 Houston Astros award winners and league leaders
 List of Houston Astros team records
 List of Major League Baseball annual doubles leaders
 List of Major League Baseball career assists as a center fielder leaders
 List of Major League Baseball career hits leaders
 List of Major League Baseball career doubles leaders
 List of Major League Baseball career putouts as a center fielder leaders
 List of Major League Baseball career runs scored leaders
 List of Major League Baseball career stolen bases leaders
 List of Major League Baseball players from the Dominican Republic
 List of Major League Baseball players to hit for the cycle

References

Further reading

External links

Cesar Cedeno at SABR (Baseball Biography Project)
Cesar Cedeno at Baseball Almanac
Cesar Cedeno at César Cedeño Biography at Baseball Biography
Cesar Cedeno at Astros Daily

1951 births
Living people
Cincinnati Reds players
Cocoa Astros players
Covington Astros players
Daytona Beach Explorers players
Dominican Republic expatriate baseball players in Mexico
Dominican Republic expatriate baseball players in the United States
Estrellas Orientales players
Florida Instructional League Astros players
Gold Coast Suns (baseball) players
Gold Glove Award winners
Houston Astros players

Los Angeles Dodgers players
Louisville Redbirds players
Major League Baseball center fielders
Major League Baseball players from the Dominican Republic
Minor league baseball coaches
National League All-Stars
Oklahoma City 89ers players
Peninsula Astros players
Saraperos de Saltillo players
Sportspeople from Santo Domingo
St. Louis Cardinals players